The Bhutan national badminton team represents Bhutan in international badminton team competitions. It is controlled by the Bhutan Badminton Federation (Dzongkha: འབྲུག་རྒྱལ་ཡོངས་སྒྲོ་རྩེད་ཚོགས་པ་གིས་), the national governing body for Bhutanese badminton.

Bhutan made their first team tournament appearance when the men's team competed in the 2016 South Asian Games in Shillong, India. The Bhutanese men's team lost to Nepal and was eliminated in the group stage. The Bhutanese mixed team also competed in the Summer Universiade.

History 
Badminton was introduced to Bhutan in the 1990s as part of the nation's economic development and as the nation opened its doors to the outside world. The national team was formed in 1994. Bhutan has been part of the Shuttle Time program organized by the Badminton World Federation since 2012.

Men's team 
The Bhutanese men's team debuted in the 2016 South Asian Games. The team were eliminated in the group stages after losing 0−3 to Nepal, Pakistan and Sri Lanka. The team were eliminated in the group stages again at the 2019 South Asian Games.

Women's team 
The women's team have yet to compete in any international team event.

Mixed team 
The Bhutanese mixed team made their debut at the 2017 Summer Universiade mixed team event. Four players were selected to debut in the event. The team were drawn into Group B with Japan and Poland. The team finished at the bottom of the group after losing 0−5 to Japan and Poland. The team withdrew from the 17th to 23rd place tie against Uganda and finished in 21st place.

Participation in Summer Universiade

Participation in South Asian Games 

Men's team

Current squad 
The following players are selected to represent Bhutan at the 2019 South Asian Games.

Men
Anish Gurung
Karma Chendru
Norbu Dradhul
Nidup Dorji

Women
Phuntsho Choden Thingh
Samjana Gurung

References 

Badminton
National badminton teams